Thomas Rodríguez Trogsar (born 5 April 1996) is a Chilean professional footballer who plays as a right midfielder for Unión Española.

Career
Rodríguez had spells with River Plate and Vélez Sarsfield in his youth career prior to joining Banfield. His professional career got started in 2015 with Banfield of the Argentine Primera División. He made his debut on 1 November, coming on as a second-half substitute in a league defeat to Rosario Central. In July 2017, Rodríguez joined Italian football by signing for Serie A side Genoa. After making his Genoa debut in the Coppa Italia on 30 November 2017 versus Crotone, Rodríguez left the club on loan in January 2018 to join Vitória Setúbal of the Primeira Liga. He didn't make a senior appearance in six months with the club.

On 9 August 2018, Chilean Primera División's Unión La Calera completed the loan signing of Rodríguez. He scored his first senior goal against Deportes Antofagasta on 18 August. Overall, Rodríguez netted three goals in twenty games for them. He returned to his parent team on 30 June. Rodríguez had interest from other Chilean teams upon returning to Genoa, though the ANFP prevented the right midfielder from joining another top-flight outfit as it went against league rules regarding multiple contracts in a single campaign; his father and agent Leonardo appealed the ruling. He terminated his Genoa contract in August.

In August 2019, Rodríguez rejoined Unión La Calera on a free transfer.

Personal life
He is the son of former Argentine international footballer Leonardo Rodríguez, who is a historical player of Universidad de Chile.

Career statistics
.

References

External links

1996 births
Living people
Footballers from Santiago
Chilean footballers
Chilean people of Argentine descent
Sportspeople of Argentine descent
Association football midfielders
Chilean expatriate footballers
Expatriate footballers in Argentina
Expatriate footballers in Italy
Expatriate footballers in Portugal
Chilean expatriate sportspeople in Argentina
Chilean expatriate sportspeople in Italy
Chilean expatriate sportspeople in Portugal
Argentine Primera División players
Serie A players
Primeira Liga players
Chilean Primera División players
Club Atlético Banfield footballers
Genoa C.F.C. players
Vitória F.C. players
Unión La Calera footballers
Universidad de Chile footballers